The Vanda & Young Global Songwriting Competition is an annual competition that "acknowledges great songwriting whilst supporting and raising money for Nordoff-Robbins" and is coordinated by Albert Music and APRA AMCOS. The competition awards a 1st, 2nd and 3rd place and was named after iconic writers Harry Vanda and George Young, known as Vanda & Young.

The competition is Australia's most prestigious and lucrative songwriting competition. The inaugural competition took place in December 2009, with Megan Washington winning with the song "How to Tame Lions".

Background
In 2009 independent music company Albert Music collaborated with APRA AMCOS to establish an international songwriter's competition. The competition open to all songwriters – published or unpublished, and all proceeds raised by the Vanda & Young Global Song writing Competition go to not-for-profit organisation Noro Music Therapy Australia (NRMTA), which uses music therapy to help people cope with the struggles of living with a wide range of needs.
 
The winners are selected by a panel of experts from a cross-section of industries.
 
The 2014's competition include an Encouragement Award with a cash prize of $2,000 which was donated by 2013 winners, The Preatures.
 
As of 2020, 1st place receives a $50,000 cash prize, 2nd place receives $10,000 and 3rd place receives $5,000. The Emerging Songwriter winner receives $5,000 courtesy Australasian Music Publishers Association.

Past winners
List of top three from each year as listed on the APRA AMCOS website.
{| class="wikitable"
|-
! Year
! style="background:gold; text-align:center;" |
! style="background:silver; text-align:center;" |
! style="background:#c96; text-align:center;"|
! Unpublished prize
|-
! scope="row"| 2009
| Megan Washington – "How to Tame Lions"
| Eskimo Joe (Kav Temperley, Joel Quartermain and Stuart Macleod) – "Foreign Land"
| Caitlin Harnett – "Tying Hands and Holding Shoelaces"
| 
|-
! scope="row"| 2010
| colspan="4" style="background:#ccc; text-align:center;"| No competition
|-
! scope="row"| 2011
| Kimbra – "Cameo Lover"
| Catherine Britt – "Sweet Emmylou"
| Gotye – "Somebody That I Used to Know"
| 
|-
! scope="row"| 2012
| colspan="4" style="background:#ccc; text-align:center;"| No competition
|-
! scope="row"| 2013
| Isabella Manfredi (The Preatures) – "Is This How You Feel?"
| Robert Conley – "Paper Thin"
| Thelma Plum – "Breathe in Breathe Out" & Jasmine Nelson – "Keep Her Close" 
| 
|-
! scope="row"| 2014
| Husky Gawenda – "Saint Joan"
| Meg Mac – "Roll Up Your Sleeves"
| David Le'aupepe (Gang of Youths) – "Poison Drum"
| Andy Bull – "Baby I Am Nobody Now" 
|-
! scope="row"| 2015
| colspan="4" style="background:#ccc; text-align:center;"| No competition
|-
! scope="row"| 2016
| Gretta Ray – "Drive"
| Emma Louise – "Underflow"
| Tigertown (Charlene Collins/Christopher Collins) "Lonely Cities" & Tia P. "4 Seats from Beyoncé" 
| 
|-
! scope="row"| 2018
| Amy Shark "Adore"
| David Le'aupepe (Gang of Youths) – "Let Me Down Easy"
| David Le'aupepe (Gang of Youths) – "The Heart Is a Muscle"
| Grace Shaw – "Better"
|-
! scope="row"| 2019
| Matt Corby and Dann Hume – "Miracle Love"
| Sarah Aarons – "The Middle"
| Sahara Beck – "Here We Go Again"
| Kaiit – "Miss Shiney"
|-
! scope="row"| 2020
| Thelma Plum – "Better in Blak"
| Baker Boy, (aka Danzal Baker) "Meditjin"
| Ruel – "Painkiller"
| Carla Geneve – "The Right Reasons"
|-
! scope="row"| 2021
| Genesis Owusu – "Gold Chains"
| Jerome Farah – "Mikey Might"
| MAY-A – "Time I Love to Waste"
| 
|-

External links

References

Australian music awards
Awards established in 2009
2009 establishments in Australia
Annual events in Australia
Recurring events established in 2009